Jan de Boer (15 February 1859 in Nieuwe Pekela – 8 June 1941 in Amsterdam) was a Dutch gymnast who competed in the 1908 Summer Olympics. He carried the flag for the Netherlands at the Olympic Opening Ceremonies in London.

He was part of the Dutch gymnastics team, which finished seventh in the team event.

References

1859 births
1941 deaths
Dutch male artistic gymnasts
Gymnasts at the 1908 Summer Olympics
Olympic gymnasts of the Netherlands
People from Pekela
Sportspeople from Groningen (province)